The 1925 NC State Wolfpack football team was an American football team that represented North Carolina State University as a member of the Southern Conference during the 1925 season. In its first season under head coach Gus Tebell, NC State compiled a 3–5–1 record (0–4–1 against conference opponent), finished in 19th place in the conference, and was outscored by a total of 72 to 51. The team played its home games at Riddick Stadium in Raleigh, North Carolina.

Schedule

References

NC State
NC State Wolfpack football seasons
NC State Wolfpack football